Lake Elmo may refer to:

Lake Elmo, Minnesota, a city in Minnesota
Lake Elmo (Minnesota), a lake in Minnesota
Lake Elmo State Park, a state park in Montana